Kim Davis (born 1965) was the county clerk of Rowan County, Kentucky who garnered notoriety for defying a U.S. federal court order to issue marriage licenses to same-sex couples.

Kim Davis may also refer to:

 Kim Davis (singer) (21st century), Canadian singer-songwriter
 Kim Davis (ice hockey) (born 1957), retired Canadian athlete
 Kim Davis (executive), American corporate executive
 Kim Davis, or Choice (20th century), American rapper
 Kim Davis, president of the Baltic-American Freedom Foundation
 Kim Davis, lead singer of Eruption
 Kim Davis, guitarist of Point Blank

See also 
 Kimberly Davis (disambiguation)
 Kim Davies (born 1954), Welsh cricketer
 Kimberley Davies (born 1973), Australian actress